Wilhelm "Utz" Utermann (3 December 1912 – 11 August 1991) was a German writer, journalist, screenwriter and film producer.

He used the following pseudonyms: William Utermann, William Roggersdorf and Mathias Racker.

As Wilhelm Roggersdorf, he edited Erich von Däniken's Chariots of the Gods? and extensively rewrote the book.

He was married to Clementine zu Castell-Rüdenhausen.

Selected filmography
 Portrait of an Unknown Woman (1954)
 Roses in Autumn (1955)
 The Golden Bridge (1956)
 Taiga (1958)
 The Ideal Woman (1959)
 You Don't Shoot at Angels (1960)
 Max the Pickpocket (1962)
 Life Begins at Eight (1962)
 He Can't Stop Doing It (1962)
 My Daughter and I (1963)
 A Mission for Mr. Dodd (1964)

References
 
 
 

1912 births
1991 deaths
People from Witten
German male journalists
20th-century German journalists